Leptoderma is a genus of slickheads found in the deep waters of the oceans.

Species
There are currently 6 recognized species in this genus:
 Leptoderma affinis Alcock, 1899 (Eel slickhead)
 Leptoderma lubricum T. Abe, Marumo & Kawaguchi, 1965
 Leptoderma macrophthalmum Byrkjedal, J. Y. Poulsen & J. K. Galbraith, 2011
 Leptoderma macrops Vaillant, 1886 (Grenadier smooth-head)
 Leptoderma ospesca Angulo, C. C. Baldwin & D. R. Robertson, 2016 (Eastern eel-slickhead)
 Leptoderma retropinna Fowler, 1943

References

Alepocephalidae
Taxa named by Léon Vaillant
Marine fish genera